"Resurrection" is the second single from rapper Common Sense's 1994 album Resurrection. Its piano-led beat, produced by No I.D., contains samples from "The Signs Pt. II" by David Axelrod, "Dolphin Dance" by Ahmad Jamal, "Sorcerer of Isis" by Power of Zeus, "Ice" by Spirit and both "Why Can't People Be Colors Too?" and "Help Is on the Way" by The Whatnauts. The song contains free-associative lyrics by Common and scratches by DJ Mista Sinista that "blend harmoniously with the jazzy melody." Nick Quested directed the "Resurrection" music video.

Track listing

A-side
 "Resurrection '95 (Clean)" (4:00)
 "Resurrection (Extra P. Remix) (Clean)" (4:09)
 "Resurrection (Large Professor Remix) (Clean)" (4:06)
 "Resurrection '95 (A cappella version)" (3:20)

B-side
 "Resurrection '95 (Instrumental)" (4:00)
 "Resurrection (Extra P. Instrumental)" (4:12)
 "Resurrection (Large Professor Instrumental)" (4:06)
 "Chapter 13 (Clean)" (5:41)

Chart positions

See also
List of Common songs

References

Common (rapper) songs
1995 singles
Song recordings produced by No I.D.
Songs written by No I.D.
Songs written by Common (rapper)
1994 songs
Relativity Records singles
Jazz rap songs